Pol-e Fahlian (also Romanized as Pol-e Fahlīān; also known as Gar-e Dodāngeh) is a village in Fahlian Rural District, in the Central District of Mamasani County, Fars Province, Iran. At the 2006 census, its population was 1,149, in 277 families.

References 

Populated places in Mamasani County